New Warriors is a team of comic book superheroes in the Marvel Comics universe. Over the years it has featured many characters in a variety of combinations.

Founding members (vol. 1)
Each of these members first appeared as a New Warrior in Thor #411. Their founding was chronicled in New Warriors (vol. 1) #1, published after their first appearance as a team.

New members (vol. 1)

Interim recruits
These members joined the team between the end of Vol. 1 and the first dissolution of the team.

New members (vol. 2)

New members (vol. 3)

New members (vol. 4)
These members were all former mutants who were depowered after the M-Day, and were either affiliated with the X-Men or students at the Xavier Institute.

Dark Reign

These members joined after the dissolution, in issue #20, of the team featured in Vol. 4.

New Warriors (vol. 5)
Another New Warriors series was launched in 2014 as part of the second Marvel NOW! wave. The status of this team after the events of Spider-Verse (apart from Nova, Hummingbird and Kaine) is unknown as none have appeared since except for Nova and Kaine.

Support staff

References

See also
New Warriors
List of New Warriors issues

New Warriors